The 1903 Purdue Boilermakers football team was an American football team that represented Purdue University during the 1903 college football season. In their first season under head coach Oliver Cutts, the Boilermakers compiled a 4–2 record before 14 players were killed in a train accident on the way to a game in Indianapolis. Purdue officials canceled the game and the remainder of Purdue's schedule, leading the Boilermakers to finish in last place in the Western Conference with an 0–2 record against conference opponents, outscoring their opponents by a total of 87 to 48. I. S. Osborn was the team captain.

Schedule

References

Purdue
Purdue Boilermakers football seasons
Purdue Boilermakers football